The Wanaque River (Native American for "place of the sassafras") is a tributary of the Pequannock River in Passaic County in northern New Jersey in the United States.

Once known as the Long Pond River, the source of the Wanaque River is Greenwood Lake, once known as Long Pond (not to be confused with the nearby village of Greenwood Lake in the state of New York).

Both Greenwood Lake and the surrounding Sterling Forest watershed straddle the border of the states of New Jersey and New York.

Downstream, the construction of dams at Monks and Wanaque created the Monksville and Wanaque reservoirs, respectively.

From the Raymond Dam of the Wanaque Reservoir, the river flows to its confluence with the Pequannock River.

See also
List of rivers of New Jersey

References

External links
 North Jersey District Water Supply Commission
 Long Pond Ironworks State Park
 Wanaque Wildlife Management Area
 Norvin Green State Forest
 Sterling Forest State Park (New York section)
 U.S. Geological Survey: NJ stream gaging stations

Rivers of Passaic County, New Jersey
Tributaries of the Passaic River
Rivers of New Jersey